Hydrobiomorpha casta is a species of water scavenger beetle in the family Hydrophilidae. It is found in the Caribbean, Central America, and North America.

References

Hydrophilinae
Articles created by Qbugbot
Beetles described in 1835